The Copa do Brasil Sub-20 (English: Brazil Under-20 Cup) is a Brazilian football competition run by the Brazilian Football Confederation for under–20 teams. In 2017, Atletico Mineiro won their first title.

Round of 32
First leg was held from 27 March – 5 April 2018.

|}

|}

Round of 16
First leg was held from 11–19 April 2018.

|}

Quarter-finals
First leg was held on 25 April and second leg was held from May 1 to 3 2018.

|}

Semi-finals
First leg was held on May 8 and 9 and second leg was held on May 15 and 17 2018.

|}

Finals
First leg was held on May 26 and second leg was held on June 2 2018.

|}

References

External links
 CBF

2018 Copa do Brasil
Youth football competitions in Brazil
2018 in Brazilian football
2018 in youth association football